Federal Reserve Bank Notes are banknotes that are legal tender in the United States issued between 1915 and 1934, together with United States Notes, Silver Certificates, Gold Certificates, National Bank Notes and Federal Reserve Notes. They were specified in the Federal Reserve Act of 1913 and had the same value as other kinds of notes of similar value. Federal Reserve Bank Notes are different from Federal Reserve Notes in that they are backed by one of the twelve Federal Reserve Banks, rather than by all collectively. Federal Reserve Bank Notes were envisioned as a replacement for National Bank Notes, but that did not prove to be the case. They were backed in a similar way to National Bank Notes, using U.S. bonds, but issued by Federal Reserve banks instead of by chartered National banks. Federal Reserve Bank Notes are no longer issued; the only U.S. banknotes still in production since 1971 are the Federal Reserve Notes.

Small size Federal Reserve Bank Notes were printed as an emergency issue in 1933 using the same paper stock as 1929 National Bank Notes. They were printed in denominations of  through . A National Bank Note has a line for the signature of the president of the national bank, but the small size Federal Reserve Bank Note printed a bar over the label for this line, since Federal Reserve Banks had governors, not presidents. The wording, "Or by like deposit of other securities" was added after the phrase, "Secured by United States bonds deposited with the Treasurer of the United States of America".   This emergency issue of notes was prompted by the public hoarding of cash due to many bank failures happening at the time. This also limited the ability of the National Banks to issue notes of their own. Small size Federal Reserve Bank Notes were discontinued in 1934 and have not been available from banks since 1945. As small size notes, they have brown seals and serial numbers, as do National Bank Notes of the era. But while they look very similar, and both have the words, "National Currency" across the top of the obverse, they had different issuers and are considered to be distinctly different types of bills.

Complete denomination type set of Federal Reserve Bank Notes

Large-size notes

Small-size notes

References

Banknotes of the United States
Bank Note
Currency lists
Historical currencies of the United States
Paper money of the United States